Talcum may refer to:
Talc, a mineral composed of hydrated magnesium silicate
Talcum, Kentucky, a community in Knott County, Kentucky
Talcum Powder (film), a 1982 Italian comedy film